Morshed Khan (born 8 August 1940) is a Bangladeshi politician who served as the Minister of Foreign Affairs of Bangladesh from 2001 until 2006. He served as a Jatiya Sangsad member representing the Chittagong-10 constituency in the 6th, 7th and 8th parliaments.

Khan was imprisoned in May 2009 in connection with a graft case in which he was sentenced to 13 years.

Education 
Khan completed his Bachelor of Engineering study from Tokyo University of Agriculture and Technology.

Career 
In 1986, Khan was elected the member of Jatiya Sangsad. He was then elected to parliament three more times (February 1996, June 1996, and 2001). He was the special envoy to the Prime Minister during the tenure of the full-fledged minister from 12 to 8, and was also the chairman of the Bangladesh Special Committee on Foreign Affairs. Morshed Khan served as the Foreign Minister of the Government of Bangladesh from 2001 to 2006.

Khan retired from politics by resigning from the vice president post of BNP on 5 November 2019.

Charges and convictions 
In December 2007, the Anti-Corruption Commission (ACC) filed cases against Khan and his wife for amassing Tk 1.7 crore wealth illegally and concealing information about wealth worth Tk 91.34 lakh in his wealth statement submitted to ACC. In August 2008, a special judge's court convicted Khan and sentenced him to 13 years' imprisonment. The High Court, in August 2010, suspended that sentence following an appeal by Khan.

In 2013, ACC filed a case Khan, his wife Nasrin Khan and their son Faisal Morshed Khan under the Money Laundering Prevention Act. In September 2019, a Dhaka court allowed the government and ACC to confiscate their assets in Hong Kong. The assets include Hong Kong dollar worth Tk 16 crore with Standard Chartered Bank and 16.8 lakh shares of Fareast Telecommunications Ltd in Hong Kong.

Personal life
Khan is married to Nasrin Khan. He has a son Faisal Morshed Khan, who was Managing director of pioneer mobile operator of Bangladesh CityCell Mobile, Pacific Bangladesh telecom. Their daughter is married to a son of Salman F Rahman.

References 

1940 births
Living people
Bangladeshi Muslims
People from Chittagong
Bangladesh Nationalist Party politicians
6th Jatiya Sangsad members
7th Jatiya Sangsad members
8th Jatiya Sangsad members
Foreign ministers of Bangladesh